George Adams (16 October 1926 – July 2011) was a Scottish professional footballer who played in the Football League, as a wing half for Leyton Orient.

Adams was born in Falkirk on 16 October 1926. He started his career at Brighton & Hove Albion and played for Chelmsford City, before joining Leyton Orient in May 1949, making his League debut against Newport County in May 1950. Unable to hold down a place in the first team, he moved to Southern League side Bath City in July 1950, joining fellow new recruits Trevor Jones, Tommy Edwards and Wilson Fairweather. He scored 7 goals in 21 appearances for the Somerset club.

References

External links

Profile at ENFA

1926 births
2011 deaths
Footballers from Falkirk
Scottish footballers
Association football wing halves
Leyton Orient F.C. players
English Football League players
Chelmsford City F.C. players
Bath City F.C. players